Combe Fields is a civil parish in the Rugby district, in the county of Warwickshire, England. The parish has no village, but contains Coombe Abbey, after which it is named, and a few isolated houses. In the 2001 census the parish had a population of 114 increasing to 126 at the 2011 census.

The parish also contains Ansty Park, a business park where Cadent Gas and the London Electric Vehicle Company have their headquarters.

At the time of the Domesday Book the parish was called Smite, which contained two settlements of Upper and Lower Smite; these were both deserted in the 12th or 13th century when Monks from Coombe Abbey enclosed them to create sheep pastures. The old parish name is retained in Smite Brook, Smeeton Lane and Smite Hill. The remains of the medieval church of St Peter of Lower Smite was converted into a house called Peter Hall in the 16th century.

References

Civil parishes in Warwickshire
Borough of Rugby